Erik Anthony Johnson (born October 11, 1965) is an American former professional baseball infielder who played for the San Francisco Giants of the Major League Baseball (MLB) in  and .

Johnson played in the 1978 Little League World Series; his team won the U.S. championship and lost in the finals to Taiwan.

External links

1965 births
Living people
American expatriate baseball players in Canada
Baseball players from Oakland, California
Calgary Cannons players
Charlotte Knights players
Clinton Giants players
Major League Baseball infielders
Phoenix Firebirds players
San Francisco Giants players
San Jose Giants players
Shreveport Captains players
UC Santa Barbara Gauchos baseball players
Pocatello Giants players